Michael Lamont (born 16 January 1967) is a New Zealand former cricketer. He played 33 first-class and 40 List A matches for Otago between 1990 and 1999.

See also
 List of Otago representative cricketers

References

External links
 

1967 births
Living people
New Zealand cricketers
Otago cricketers
Cricketers from Invercargill